Luis Roberto Cervantes Godínez (born 9 February 2001) is a Mexican professional footballer who plays as a full-back for Liga MX club León.

Career statistics

Club

Notes

Honours
Club Domestic
Liga MX 2021–22 Apertura Runner-up

References

External links

 
 

Living people
2001 births
Mexican footballers
Association football defenders
Club León footballers
Liga MX players
Footballers from Guanajuato
People from Guanajuato City